The Selennyakh Range (Selennyakhsky Khrebet) is a range of mountains in far North-eastern Russia. Administratively the range is part of the Sakha Republic of the Russian Federation. The town of Deputatsky, capital of the Ust-Yansky District, is located in the area of the range.

Geography
It is parallel to the latter and separated from it by the Moma-Selennyakh Depression, a wide intermontane basin, where the river Selennyakh flows and that continues southeastwards along the western side of the Moma Range. The Aby Lowland lies to the east and to the north the Yana-Indigirka Lowland. To the northeast it connects with the Kyun-Tas, at the western end of the Polousny Range, and to the northwest with the far north of the Chersky mountain system.
In some works the Selennyakh Range is included as a part of the Chersky Range mountain system.

Other subranges of the wider Selennyakh are the Nemkuchan Range in the northeast —a small ridge along the river of the same name facing the Kyun-Tas, the Esteriktyakh-Tas in the east, and the Tommot Massif and Andrey-Tas at the southern end.

The main rivers of the range are the Uyandina and Selennyakh rivers, both left tributaries of the Indigirka, as well as the Chondon, which flows northwards into the Laptev Sea.

Flora
Permafrost prevails in the area of the range. The river valleys of the range have sparse larch forests, and above  there is a narrow pre-tundra belt in which alder and dwarf cedar predominate. In the higher altitudes there is mountain tundra.

See also
List of ultras of Northeast Asia

References

External links
Regional populations and migration of moose in northern Yakutia, Russia.

Mountain ranges of the Sakha Republic

ceb:Selennyakhskaya Gryada